Princess Wencheng was a member of a minor branch of the royal clan of the Tang dynasty who married King Songtsen Gampo of the Tibetan Empire in 641. She is also known by the name Gyasa or "Chinese wife" in Tibet. Some Tibetan historians consider both Princess Wencheng and Songtsen Gampo's other wife Bhrikuti to be physical manifestations of the bodhisattva Tara.

Chinese accounts of Princess Wencheng

Life 
According to Chinese accounts, in the spring of 634 on an official state visit to Imperial China, Tibetan King Songtsen Gampo fell in love at first sight and had relentlessly pursued the princess's hand by sending envoys and tributes but was refused.

Allegedly, in 635/636, royal Tibetan forces were deployed, attacking and defeating the peoples of  Tuyuhun who strategically lived near the Lake of Koko Nor in present-day Qinghai, impeding a trade route into Imperial China. News of Tibetan King Songtsen Gampo's attack on Songzhou quickly spread from the ground to the Royal Courtiers, and Emperor Taizong dispatched his Militia and defeated Songtsen Gampo's army, causing Songtsen Gampo's retreat. He then sent a written expressed apology to the Tang Emperor. The Tang Emperor upon seeing Songtsen Gampo's sincerity, then agreed to marry the princess to the Tibetan king.

In 640 AD, Songtsen Gampo sent Lu Dongzan, an eloquent and witty minister, to be an envoy to Chang'an, offering thousands of taels of gold and hundreds of rare toys to propose marriage to Emperor Tang.

Tibetan sources (and Chinese sources not aligned with the PRC government), by contrast, say Songtsen Gampo sent an envoy to Luoyang, the Tang capital demanding (rather than requesting) a Chinese bride and insisting he would lead 50,000 battle-hardened Tibetan troops to the sparsely defended capital and slaughter the inhabitants if he was not given this tribute.

Route to Tibet 
The route 'from Dongdao Kang District' is more reasonable, because from Chang'an to Baoji, Tianshui, Wenxian, Songpan, Jinchuan, Danba, along the Yutong River Valley (now Luding Dadu River), to Kangding, Muya, along the Its river valley, or westward and along the river valley, reaches the Jinsha River Valley, passes through Dengke, Yushu, passes through the Tongtian River Valley, passes through the Tanggula Mountain Pass, and passes through the Heihe River to Lhasa. This is also the transportation route from the mainland of the Central Plains to Lhasa. Objectively, this route can avoid the dangerous pass of the Hengduan Mountains in the east and the blockage of the Kunlun Mountains in the north. Huang Xianming said in the article "A Preliminary Exploration of Princess Wencheng's Human-Tibetan Route" that when the Tubo envoys came to Chang'an to ask for marriage, they all travelled in this way.

Legacy 
According to the Tibetan history, the Songtsen Gampo's and Princess Wencheng's union brought hopes of promoting a harmonious, matrimonial relationship between the peoples of Tibet and China.

Princess Wencheng's life is depicted in novels such as the Maṇi bka' 'bum and the famed historiographies of Rgyal rabs Gsal ba'i Me long.

Tradruk Temple in Nêdong commemorates Princess Wencheng: a thangka embroidered by the Princess is kept in one of its chapels.

Two traditional days, the fifteenth day of the fourth month and the fifteenth day of the tenth month of each Tibetan year, are marked by singing and dancing in honor of Princess Wencheng.

Historical relics such as the statues of Songtsen Gampo with Princess Wencheng are still worshiped and displayed for all to see along the trail of their wedding trip as well as in the Potala Palace at Lhasa.

Legend has it that Songtsen Gampo, Princess Wencheng and Princess Chizun took more than three years to build the Jokhang Temple together. The seated statue of Sakyamuni brought by Princess Wencheng is enshrined.

Chinese claims of influence 
Allegedly, Princess Wencheng brought with her promises of trade agreements, maps on the Silk Road and a substantial amount of dowry which contained not only gold, but fine furniture, silks, porcelains, books, jewelry, musical instruments, and medical books.

Also, Princess Wencheng allegedly arrived with new agricultural methods. This possibly included the introduction of seeds of grains, and rapeseed, other farming tools and advice on how to increase Tibetan agricultural productivity in the region.

Chinese sources credit Princess Wencheng for introducing Tibet with other skills in metallurgy, farming, weaving, and construction. However, at least one of these is questionable because the Tang Historian Du Fu notes Tibet's metallurgical skills in terms suggesting they surpassed those known to Tang China. The Tang Annals report that Songsten Gampo wrote to Emperor Taizong in 648, requesting paper, ink, and other writing utensils. This has been taken by some modern Chinese sources to mean that the princess was involved in the request, and thereby introduced the methods of Chinese ink and paper production to Tibet. However, archaeological evidence indicates that papermaking technology was known in Tibet before the princess' arrival, likely spreading through southern trade routes.

When Princess Wencheng entered Tibet, the tea drinking style of the Han people in the Tang dynasty was very flourishing. Because Princess Wencheng likes to drink tea, she brought many famous teas to Tibet with her.Over time, she developed a habit of adding some milk and sugar to tea when having brerakfast. This practice of Princess Wencheng gradually led to the imitation of officials and dignitaries in the palace, and Princess Wencheng often rewarded ministers with milk tea and entertained relatives and friends. At the same time, in order to increase the taste and fun of drinking tea, the princess also added pine nuts, ghee, etc., and added sugar or salt according to people's preferences, so the ghee tea was made.

With the deepening of economic and trade exchanges and cultural exchanges between Tang and Tubo, Tubo culture has gradually been integrated into the life of the Tang people. For example, polo, which originated in Tubo, was a popular sports event in the Tang dynasty.

Tubo women's dress-up, such as the He Mian, the bun and the rosary, also had a certain influence on the Tang dynasty.

Princess Wencheng is revered in China for being one of the brides who brought Chinese culture to the peoples beyond their borders - expanding their civilization with culture and knowledge.

Legend 
According to legend, Rishan and Yueshan (Riyue Mountain) were transformed by the precious mirror of Princess Wencheng. Princess Wencheng walked to the dividing line between Tang and Tubo, and threw the Sun and Moon Mirror given by her parents behind her to cut off the endless thoughts of her relatives.

Legend has it that when Princess Wencheng and her party went to Lhasa by way of Chaya, they made a short stop in the beautiful Renda. In order to commemorate this place that made the princess feel relaxed and happy, the princess showed 9 Buddha statues including the Great Sun Tathagata on the Danma Cliff with her extraordinary good fortune and merit. The princess also plans to build a temple here. However, although there are towering mountains in this area, there is not a single tree. The princess used her magic power, just like Sun Wukong, the great sage of the sky, pulling out a few hairs from her head and blowing it on the mountain. On the cliff rock, a large forest miraculously grows. So the local people cut down the trees and built the Renda Hall. At the same time, the princess also taught the locals to open up wasteland and farm fields, divert water for irrigation, and use water mills. Later, the local people regarded the statue of Renda as a magical creation of Princess Wencheng, and regarded it as a sacred place. Good men and women from far and near came to the Renda Hall to worship the Buddha, burn incense and kowtow, to pray for peace in the world, good weather and happiness for the people.

In Chinese literature 
In the first narrative, which is from Chinese classical literature, Princess Wencheng was treated as an insignificant figure and the text paid much more attention to the ceremony of the “peace-making marriage” than to the princess's individual traits. In the second narrative, which is from Tibetan ancient literature, the princess was portrayed as the incarnation of “Green Tara”, a tantric deity in Tibetan Buddhism, and supposedly possessed goddess qualities and magical powers. The third narrative, which was shaped by the nationalist discourse during the first part of the 20th century, depicted a new image of Princess Wencheng, gradually transforming her into a “transmitter of technology.”

In popular culture 

Since the 2000s, the Chinese state has been presenting an opera in Tibet which tells the story of Princess Wencheng. According to some observers, this opera whitewashes Tibet's history and its historical relationship with China.

The work "Princess Wencheng" was written by Zhang Minghe, a famous Chinese lyricist. From when Princess Wencheng first entered the Tibetan area to the life of the Tibetan people, to her being praised and sung by the Tibetan people.

Footnotes

References and further reading 
 
 
 
 
 
 
 
 
 

 

7th-century Chinese women
7th-century Chinese people
7th-century Tibetan people
628 births
680s deaths
Year of birth uncertain
Buddhism-related controversies
Controversies in China
Controversies in Tibet
Annexation of Tibet by the People's Republic of China
Politics of Tibet
Tang dynasty princesses
Tibetan empresses
Tang–Tibet relations
Tibetan independence movement